

Etymology
The origin of the name Kazan is uncertain. It could very well derive from the Bulgars - the Bulgarian (from the Bulgar language) and Tatar word (absorbed from the Bulgars) qazan means 'boiler' or 'cauldron'. Alternately, it may have been derived from the Tatar qazğan, 'dug' (with reference to ditches). Qazan is originally a name for a special cooking pan, similar to the wok, but heavier. The belief that the city of Kazan is named after this object comes from the terrain's similarity to a qazan: the city is situated in a U-shaped lowland. Another, more romantic legend tells a story of a Tatar princess Söyembikä, who dropped a golden dish (golden qazan) into the river while washing it, and that the city was founded at that site. Additionally, legends of the Chuvash people refer to the Bulgarian Prince Khusan (Хусан) (this being the Chuvash rendering of the Muslim name Hasan) and that is the Chuvash name for the city.

Historical naming 

 Tatar (now, 1928–1939): Qazan;
 (1939–2000): Казан;
 (1918–1928): قازان ;
 (1918–1922), Arab: قزان ;
 Russian: Каза́нь [Kazan];
 Arab (hist.): Bulgar al-Jadid (in Tatar transliteration:Bolğar âl-Cädid) - New Bolğar;
 Turkish: Kazan
 German: Kasan, Latin: Casan, French: Kazan, Polish: Kazań, Latvian: Kazaņa,
 Finnish: (Old) Kasaani (New) Kasani

History

Middle ages  

There is a long-running dispute as to whether Kazan was founded by the Volga Bulgars in the early Middle Ages or by the Tatars of the Golden Horde in the mid-15th century, as written records before the latter period are sparse. If there were a Bulgar city on the site, estimates of the date of its foundation range from the early 11th century to the late 13th century (see Iske Qazan). It was a border post between Volga Bulgaria and two Finnic tribes, the Mari and the Udmurt. Another vexatious question is where the citadel was built originally. Archaeological explorations have produced evidence of urban settlement in three parts of the modern city: in the Kremlin; in Bişbalta at the site of the modern Zilantaw monastery; and near the Qaban lake. The oldest of these seems to be the Kremlin.

If Kazan existed in the 11th and 12th centuries, it could have been a stop on a Volga trade route from Scandinavia to Iran. It was a trade center, and possibly a major city for Bulgar settlers in the Kazan region, although their capital was further south at the city of Bolğar.

After the Mongols devastated the Bolğar and Bilär areas in the 13th century, migrants resettled Kazan. Kazan became a center of a duchy which was a dependency of the Golden Horde. Two centuries later, in the 1430s, Hordian Tatars (such as Ghiasetdin of Kazan) usurped power from its Bolghar dynasty.

Some Tatars also went to Lithuania, brought by Vytautas the Great.

In 1438, after the destruction of the Golden Horde, Kazan became the capital of the powerful Khanate of Kazan. The city bazaar, Taş Ayaq (Stone Leg)' became the most important trade center in the region, especially for furniture. The citadel and Bolaq channel were reconstructed, giving the city a strong defensive capacity. The Russians managed to occupy the city briefly several times.

The Tsarist period 

As a result of the Siege of Kazan (1552) Russia under Ivan the Terrible conquered the city for good, the majority of the population was massacred. From During the governorship of Alexander Gorbatyi-Shuisky, most of the khanates's Tatar residents were killed or forcibly Christianized. Mosques and palaces were ruined. Tatars in the Russian service were settled in the Tatar Bistäse settlement near the city's wall. Later Tatar merchants and handicraft masters also settled there. During this period, Kazan was largely destroyed as a result of several great fires. After one of them in 1579, the icon Our Lady of Kazan was discovered in the city. In the early 17th century, at the beginning of the Time of Troubles in Russia, the Kazan Khanate declared independence with the help of the Russian population, but this independence was suppressed by Kuzma Minin in 1612. 

During his stay in Kazan in the 1640s, Adam Olearius reported that the Kazan Kremlin was "occupied only by the Russians, and not a single Tatar could live there, under penalty of death". During the Tsarist period, much of the local Tatar architecture was destroyed.

In the Russian Empire 
In 1708, the Khanate of Kazan was abolished, and Kazan became the center of a guberniya. After Peter the Great's visit, the city became a center of shipbuilding for the Caspian fleet. The major Russian poet Gavrila Romanovich Derzhavin was born in Kazan in 1743, the son of a poor country squire of Tatar ancestry though himself having a thoroughly Russian identity. Kazan was largely destroyed in 1774 as a result of the Pugachev revolt, a revolt by border troops and peasants led by the Don Cossack ataman (captain) Yemelyan Pugachev, but was rebuilt soon afterwards, during the reign of Catherine the Great. Catherine also decreed that mosques could again be built in Kazan, the first being Marjani Mosque. But discrimination against the Tatars continued. In the beginning of the 19th century Kazan State University and printing press were founded by Alexander I. It became an important center for Oriental Studies in Russia. The Qur'an was first printed in Kazan in 1801. Kazan became an industrial center and peasants migrated there to join its industrial workforce. In 1875, a horse tramway appeared; 1899 saw the installation of a tramway. After the Russian Revolution of 1905, Tatars were allowed to revive Kazan as a Tatar cultural center. The first Tatar theater and the first Tatar newspaper appeared.

Soviet period 

In 1917, Kazan became one of the revolution centers, Gunpowder Plant fire occurred in the city. In 1918, Kazan was a capital of the Idel-Ural State, which was suppressed by the Bolshevist government. In the Kazan Operation of August 1918, it was briefly occupied by Czechoslovak Legions. In 1920 (after the October Revolution), Kazan became the center of Tatar Autonomous Soviet Socialist Republic. In the 1920s and 1930s, most of the city's mosques and churches were destroyed, as occurred elsewhere in the USSR. During World War II, many industrial plants and factories to the west were relocated in Kazan, making the city a center of the military industry, producing tanks and planes. After the war, Kazan consolidated as industrial and scientific center. In 1979, the city's population reached the number of 1 million. Around this period the city was gripped by a moral panic in the form of the rise of juvenile delinquency and street gangs in what became known as the "Kazan phenomenon".

Modern times 
In the late 1980s and in the 1990s, after the dissolution of the USSR, Kazan again became the center of Tatar culture, and separatist tendencies intensified. With returning of capitalism era Kazan became one of the most important centers of Russian Federation. The city came up from 10th to 6th position in population ranking of Russian cities.  Since 2000, the city has been undergoing a renovation. The historical center, including its Kremlin, has been rebuilt. Kazan celebrated its millennium in 2005, although the date of the «millennium», was fixed rather arbitrarily. During the millennium celebrations, one of the largest mosque in Russia, Qolsharif, was inaugurated in the Kazan Kremlin, the holiest copy of Our Lady of Kazan was returned to the city, and the "Millennium Bridge" was also inaugurated that year. The city hosted the 2013 Summer Universiade and 2018 FIFA World Cup. In 2021, a mass shooting occurred at a school.

Timeline 

 End of the 10th — beginning of the 11th century - the city was founded
 End of the 14th — beginning of the 15th century Kazan becomes a capital of Kazan khanate
 1408 - starts to mint own coins
 1552 Kazan was seized by Ivan the Terrible and Kazan khanate became a part of Russian state
 1556 - construction of modern Kremlin
 Since 1708 - centre of Kazan province
 1759 - the first provincial classical school was opened
 1771 - two madrasahs were opened (Akhun and Apanay)
 1791 - first theatre was opened
 1804 - Kazan State University was opened
 1874 - gas lighting in Kazan
 1896 - connected to Moscow by railroad
 1899 - electrical tram and urban water supply started to work
 1920 - Kazan is a capital of Tatar Autonomous Soviet Socialistic Republic (and then Tatarstan)
 1979 - population is over 1 million inhabitants
 2005 - Kazan Metro was opened

References

Further reading

 Matthew P. Romaniello. The Elusive Empire: Kazan and the Creation of Russia, 1552-1671 (University of Wisconsin Press; 2012) 296 pages.
 Muhammad Murad Ramzi (محمد مراد الرمزي) (1908), Talfīq al-akhbār wa-talfīḥ al-āthār fī waqāʼiʻ Qazān wa-Bulghār wa-mulūk al-Tātār (تلفيق الاخبار وتلقيح الآثار في وقائع قزان وبلغار وملوك التتار), First edition (الطبعة الاولي) Volume 1 (المجلد الاول) Printed at the Al-Karīmiyyah and Al-Ḥussayniyyah printing shop in the town of "Orenburg" upon committed expenses (طبع بالمطبعة الكريمية والحسينية ببلدة "اورنبورغ" على مصاريف ملتزمه).